Diario de Aragón (meaning Aragon Daily in English) was a Spanish language daily newspaper published from Zaragoza, Spain. It was launched around the time of the Popular Front victory in the 1936 general election. The first issue was published on 14 February 1936. Politically, the newspaper was supportive of the Popular Front and, in particular, the Republican Left. The publication was discontinued as the Spanish Civil War broke out in July 1936.

References

1936 establishments in Spain
1936 disestablishments in Spain
Publications established in 1936
Publications disestablished in 1936
Defunct newspapers published in Spain

Newspapers published in Aragon
Spanish-language newspapers
Mass media in Zaragoza
Daily newspapers published in Spain